The Tumbarumba Football Netball Club, nicknamed the Roos, is an Australian rules football and netball club which plays in the Upper Murray Football League. The club is based in New South Wales town of Tumbarumba and plays its home games at the Tumbarumba Recreation Reserve.

History 
The Tumbarumba Football Club was formed in 1969 and commenced playing in the Upper Murray Football League in 1971, the club is based in a Rugby League dominated town and has struggled for success on-field since its formation. Senior success has been scarce for the Kangaroos; however, they have won numerous reserve flags whilst their junior sides have been the most successful of any club in the past decade.

The club has been runners up in 1980, and 1998 and  2008 before winning back-to-back premierships in 2012 and 2013.

References

External links
 Gameday website
 Club profile on Australian Football.com

Netball teams in New South Wales
Australian rules football clubs in New South Wales
1969 establishments in Australia
Multi-sport clubs in Australia
Sports clubs established in 1969